Doctor in the Nude  is a 1973 comedy novel by the British writer Richard Gordon. It is part of the long-running Doctor series.

References

Bibliography
 Pringle, David. Imaginary People: A Who's who of Fictional Characters from the Eighteenth Century to the Present Day. Scolar Press, 1996.

1973 British novels
Novels by Richard Gordon
Comedy novels
Medical novels
Heinemann (publisher) books